Simon was the first known constable of Jerusalem. Maybe he was from the House of Limburg, son of Henry, Duke of Lower Lorraine and Count of Limburg, and Adelaide, daughter of Botho of Pottenstein.

He is cited in two royal charters, the first in 1108 and the second in 1115 as Symon ducis filius. He may be identified with the Simontos, mentioned by Anna Comnena as an envoy of Baldwin I of Jerusalem to Tripoli in order to receive Greek ambassadors in 1108. She calls him a cousin of the king. Together these imply that he was likely a son of Henry, Duke of Lower Lorraine, a great-grandson of Eustace I of Boulogne by his maternal grandmother.

Christians of the Crusades